JM may refer to:

Places
 Jamaica (ISO 3166-1 alpha-2 country code JM)
 Jay Em, Wyoming, a community in the United States

Businesses and organizations
 Jack's Mannequin, a piano rock band
 Jama'at al-Jihad al-Islami, an Islamic terrorist group active in Central Asia
 Air Jamaica (1968-2015, IATA code JM)
 Jambojet (IATA code JM)
 Jaysh Muhammad, an Iraqi insurgency group
 Jerónimo Martins, a Portuguese company
 Johnson Matthey, a British chemicals and metals company
 Joseph Magnin Co.

Other uses
 A shortened form of James
 Fender Jazzmaster, an American guitar model
 Juris Master, a degree similar to the Master of Laws
 Just Muslim, a religious denomination